Robert W. "Bob" Delegall (July 24, 1945 – March 21, 2006) was an American actor, television director and producer. He has guest starred in number of notable television series namely Adam-12, Good Times, The Six Million Dollar Man, Knots Landing and among other series.

Life and career
Delegall was born in Philadelphia, Pennsylvania. Along with acting on film and television he appeared in a number of Philadelphia and Broadway theater productions namely The Basic Training of Pavlo Hummel and The Sunshine Train among others.

Delegall was also an acting coach teaching actors Gregory Hines, Malcolm-Jamal Warner, Michael O'Keefe and Tyra Banks.

After guest starring in number of notable television series, Delegall pursued a career in television directing and producing in 1997. He served as director and producer on the CBS sitcom The Gregory Hines Show followed by directing episodes of the Showtime drama Linc's in 1998. He went back to acting in 2003 after a seven-year hiatus.

Death
Delegall died on March 21, 2006 in Venice, California after fighting a ten-year battle with prostate cancer. He is survived by his wife Fran Saperstein, a film and television producer and their two children, Jewel and Eric.

Filmography

References

External links

1945 births
2006 deaths
20th-century American male actors
21st-century American male actors
American male film actors
African-American male actors
African-American television directors
American male stage actors
American male television actors
American television directors
Television producers from Pennsylvania
Deaths from cancer in California
Deaths from prostate cancer
Male actors from Philadelphia
20th-century African-American people
21st-century African-American people